The 1928 United States Senate elections in Arizona took place on November 6, 1928. Incumbent Democratic U.S. Senator Henry F. Ashurst ran for reelection to a fourth term, defeating Republican nominee former U.S. Senator Ralph H. Cameron in the general election. Cameron was defeated in the previous election year, in 1926, by then-U.S. Congressman Carl T. Hayden, leading Cameron to decide to challenge Ashurst in order to return to the United States Senate.

Democratic primary

Candidates
 Henry F. Ashurst, incumbent U.S. Senator
 Charles H. Rutherford, candidate for U.S. Senate in 1926

Results

Republican primary

Candidates
 Ralph H. Cameron, former U.S. Senator
 Frank R. Stewart

Results

General election

See also 
 United States Senate elections, 1928

References

1928
Arizona
United States Senate